Fu Yuanhui (born January 7, 1996) is a Chinese competitive swimmer who specializes in backstroke. She won a bronze medal at the 2016 Rio Olympics in the 100-meter backstroke.

Early life
On January 7, 1996, Fu was born in Hangzhou, Zhejiang, China. She is the only daughter to her parents Fu Chunsheng (傅春昇) and Shen Ying (沈英).

Fu started swimming at the age of 5.

Swimming career

2012 Summer Olympics
At the 2012 Summer Olympics in London, she competed in the Women's 100 metre backstroke, finishing in 8th place in the final.

2013 World Championships
At the 2013 World Aquatics Championship in Barcelona, Fu placed second in the 50 metre backstroke, losing to her teammate Zhao Jing with a time of 27.39s.

2014 Asian Games
At the 2014 Asian Games in Incheon, Fu won two gold medals in the 50 m and 100 m backstroke.

2015 World Championships

 
She won the 50 metre backstroke at the World Aquatics Championship in 2015 and helped China win the 4x100 metre medley. In the interview, Fu complained her swimsuit was too tight.

2016 Summer Olympics

At the 2016 Summer Olympics in Rio, Fu gained popularity and became a swimming icon nationwide.

Fu won a bronze medal in the 100-meter backstroke by tying for third place with Canadian swimmer Kylie Masse. She finished in a national record time of 58.76. Throughout the Olympics, her cheerful interviews and goofy demeanor made her very popular. Mark Dreyer, a Beijing-based sports writer, noted that Fu exemplified "a positive trend in Chinese sports whereby athletics was undergoing a transition away from "manufactured Olympic champions" from the state-run sports system who were effective at bringing home medals but had cardboard personalities and inspired little devotion among fans'. Her series of facial expressions spread widely in the Internet, and her sayings such as "I've already spent my supernatural energy!"（Chinese: 我已使出了洪荒之力！）become very popular catchwords.

A few days later, after her lackluster performance in the 4×100-meter medley relay where the team placed fourth, she told an interviewer that she was on her period; many commended her decision to speak about this, menstruation being considered a taboo topic in sports.

2016 Asian Swimming Championships
At the 2016 Asian Swimming Championships in Tokyo, Fu won gold medals for the first time. She won two gold medals in the 50 m and 100 m backstroke and a silver medal in the 4 × 100 m medley relay. Fu was very happy to show her medals on her Weibo.

Personal life
Since 2016, Fu has been one of the most popular athletes in China. She takes part in some TV talk shows and charity activities. Fu also makes friends with many other swimmers such as Sun Yang and Ye Shiwen.
 She was a guest of the 2017 CCTV New Year's Gala.

Personal bests (long course)

Notes and references 

1996 births
Living people
Sportspeople from Hangzhou
Swimmers from Zhejiang
Olympic swimmers of China
Chinese female backstroke swimmers
Swimmers at the 2012 Summer Olympics
Swimmers at the 2016 Summer Olympics
Olympic bronze medalists in swimming
2016 Olympic bronze medalists for China
Medalists at the 2016 Summer Olympics
World Aquatics Championships medalists in swimming
Asian Games medalists in swimming
Swimmers at the 2014 Asian Games
Swimmers at the 2018 Asian Games
Asian Games gold medalists for China
Asian Games silver medalists for China
Medalists at the 2014 Asian Games
Medalists at the 2018 Asian Games
21st-century Chinese women